Everything's the Rush is the third studio album by British rock band Delays. It was released on 5 May 2008 through  Fiction and Polydor Records. As touring in promotion for their second studio album You See Colours wrapped up in 2006, the band decamped to Space Mountain in Spain with producer Martin "Youth" Glover to work on its follow up. After recording one song at Mayfair Studios in London, recording concluded after 20 days in total. Everything's the Rush is an indie pop album that recalls the sound of their debut studio album Faded Seaside Glamour (2004), with the addition of orchestral elements.

Everything's the Rush received generally favourable reviews from critics, some of whom commented on the musicianship and Gilbert's voice, while others were critical of Youth's production. The album peaked at number 26 on the UK Albums Chart. Preceded by the Love Made Visible EP in late 2007, Delays went on a tour of the United Kingdom to close out the year. They opened 2008 with another UK tour, which led up to the release of the lead single from Everything's the Rush, "Hooray", in April 2008. A third UK tour followed, though some of the shows had to be cancelled due to frontman Greg Gilbert suffering from laryngitis. "Keep It Simple" was released as the album's second single in August 2008, surrounding appearances at various festivals.

Background and recording
Delays released their second studio album You See Colours in March 2006, which peaked at number 24 in the UK Albums Chart. Its two singles "Valentine" and "Hideaway" reached the top 40 in the United Kingdom, with the former charting the highest at number 23. The album's release was promoted with two tours of the UK (bookending either end of the year), and then a stint in the United States with toured the US alongside Franz Ferdinand and the Futureheads. Sessions for the follow-up were held at Space Mountain in Sierra Nevada, Spain, with Martin "Youth" Glover producing and Clive Goddard handling recording; the pair were assisted by Joel Cormack. "Keep It Simple" was recorded at Mayfair Studios in London; recording lasted for 20 days in total.

Discussing the short turnover time, Aaron Gilbert said the band "didn't want to spend 2 days working on a guitar solo or something like that", avoiding the overanalysing that they did for You See Colours. Gilbert liked Youth's previous work with the likes of the Orb, Primal Scream and the Verve. He said the band and Youth worked on a schedule of 11AM to 2AM, where they had a "more Beatles-style ethic with him, so rather than thinking about guitar over-dubs, we did it on the spot". Cenzo Townshend mixed nearly all of the recordings, save for "Pieces", at Olympic Studios with assistance from Neil Comber. Michael Brauer mixed "Pieces" at Quad Studios in New York City, with assistance from Will Hensley, who also served as the Pro-Tools engineer. The album was then mastered by Tim Young.

Composition
Musically, the sound of Everything's the Rush has been described as indie pop, harking back to form of their debut studio album Faded Seaside Glamour (2004), with addition of orchestral elements. Fiona McKinlay of musicOMH said the synthesizer work on You See Colours are "now acting more like a (jolly good) support system for a sunnier band" on Everything's the Rush. Gilbert sung lead vocals on "One More Lie in", "Friends Are False" and "No Contest". Wil Malone arranged the string sections on "One More Lie in", "Pieces" and "Silence", with Perry Montague-Mason as the string leader. Warren Zielinski, Peter Lale, Tony Pleeth and Chris Laurence served as the principals of their respective sections (violin, viola, cello and double bass).

Everything's the Rush opens with the 1980s stadium rock atmosphere of "Girl's on Fire", reminiscent of the work of U2. "Hooray" was the first track Aaron Gilbert wrote after buying a new orchestra synthesizer for his computer; Greg Gilbert added lyrics about OCD, which he deals with. "Love Made Visible" is an electropop track that employs the use of a vocoder; "One More Lie In" deals with being lazy. "Keep It Simple" is a symphonic pop track in the vein of Manic Street Preachers. The ballad "Pieces" evokes the sound of the Verve's Urban Hymns (1997), and is followed by the celtic-esque "Touch Down". The Muse-lite progressive rock of "Friends Are False" recalled the band's own "Stay Where You Are", found on Faded Seaside Glamour, and is followed by the indie disco of "No Contest". The album concludes with the acoustic track "Jet Lag".

Release
On 21 September 2007, Everything's the Rush was announced for release in early 2008. Delays released the Love Made Visible EP on 5 November 2007, which consisted of "Love Made Visible", "Panic Attacks", "Slow Burn", "You See Colours" and a remix of "We Together Make a City". It was promoted with a tour of the UK that same month. In February and March 2008, they went on another UK tour, which was followed by a one-off London show on 6 April 2008. "Hooray" was released as a single on 28 April 2008, a week after its initial planned date; "Chest Out" was included on the CD edition. Two versions were released on 7-inch vinyl: the first with an acoustic version of "Panic Attacks", while the other featured "All Day".

Everything's the Rush was originally planned for release on April 28, 2008, before eventually being released on 5 May 2008. The album's artwork was made by Icelandic artist Siggi Eggertson, who the band showed around Southampton. It was promoted with a UK tour, though some gigs were cancelled due to Gilbert contracting laryngitis. They then appeared at Ben & Jerry's festival in July 2008. "Keep It Simple" was released as a single on 11 August 2008; Ewen MacIntosh starred in the song's music video. Two versions were released on 7-inch vinyl: the first with "Go Slowly", while the other included "One More Lie In (Part 2)". Around the single's release, the band performed at the Wireless, Oxegen, T in the Park and V Festivals. Outtakes from the album were included on the Lost Tunes EP, which was released in December 2008. It consisted of "Christine", "These Days", "Bad Moon Rising" and "Tonight"; the 10-inch vinyl version added an acoustic demo of "Keep It Simple".

Reception

Everything's the Rush was met with generally favourable reviews from music critics. At Metacritic, which assigns a normalized rating out of 100 to reviews from mainstream publications, the album received an average score of 64, based on seven reviews.

AllMusic reviewer Jon O'Brien saw the album as the band's "most cinematic to date", which sidesteps the majority of their "mid-noughties contemporaries' recent offerings". Kai Jones of Gigwise was highly critical, stating that that album was "so over-laden with giddy, flowery choruses and bouncy Monkees-style verses that the Delays are in danger of turning into a Take That full of Mark Owen". Drowned in Sound Dom Gourlay said the band "missed a golden opportunity to add something out of the ordinary to their admittedly melodic, if decidedly predictable sound" having Youth as their producer. The Independent music critic Andy Gill wrote that by using Youth, the "already bombastic performances are further expanded with an inflated self-regard that either overwhelms or irritates, depending on one's tolerance". Yahoo! Music writer Jaime Gill, however, criticized Youth's "overbearing production", as "[p]ractically every track comes complete with a distracting and tricksy intro".

Dave Simpson of The Guardian wrote that Greg Gilbert's voice "sound[s] more road-scuffed than before, though this doesn't prevent things occasionally getting too gooey". O'Brien noted that Greg Gilbert's "gutsy falsetto tones -- the band's most distinctive secret weapon -- are kept to a bare minimum", giving way to Aaron Gilbert's on three songs, who "only highlights just how valuable an asset their usual frontman is". Bournemouth Daily Echo writer Lisa Willmot said that the band's "perfect harmonies are still there", while Gilbert's voice "make the record a little quirkier and rougher around the edges". Pitchfork Ian Cohen, on the other hand, said his "froggy every-bloke accent strips the band of their most distinguishing characteristic".

Everything's the Rush peaked at number 26 on the UK Albums Chart.

Track listing
All tracks by Greg Gilbert and Aaron Gilbert, except where noted.

"Girl's on Fire" - 4:26
"Hooray" - 3:30
"Love Made Visible" - 3:59
"One More Lie in" - 3:30
"Keep It Simple" - 4:11
"Pieces" (G. Gilbert) - 5:29
"Touch Down" - 3:09
"Friends Are False" - 4:10
"No Contest" - 4:06
"Silence" (G. Gilbert) - 3:03
"Jet Lag" - 4:04

UK bonus track
"The Earth Gave Me You" - 4:03

Personnel
Personnel per booklet, except where noted.

Delays
 Greg Gilbert – guitar, vocals
 Aaron Gilbert – keyboard, vocals (tracks 4, 8 and 9)
 Colin Fox – bass
 Rowly – drums

Production and design
 Youth – producer
 Clive Goddard – recording
 Joel Cormack – assistant
 Cenzo Townshend – mixing (all except track 6)
 Neil Comber – assistant
 Michael Brauer – mixing (track 6)
 Will Hensley – mix assistant, Pro-Tools engineer
 Tim Young – mastering
 Big Active – art direction
 Markus Karlsson – design
 Siggi Eggertson – illustration

Additional musicians
 Tim Bran – programming
 Wil Malone – string arranger (tracks 4, 6 and 10)
 Perry Montague-Mason – string leader
 Warren Zielinski – principal 2nd
 Patrick Kiernan – violin
 Boguslav Kostecki – violin
 Jackie Shave – violin
 Chris Tombling – violin
 Jonathan Rees – violin
 David Woodcock – violin
 Mark Berrow – violin
 Emlyn Singleton – violin
 Liz Edwards – violin
 Rita Manning – violin
 Julian Leaper – violin
 Cathy Thompson – violin

Additional musicians (continued)
 Jim McLeod – violin
 Mike McMenemy – violin
 Dai Emanuel – violin
 Tom Pigott-Smith – violin
 Peter Lale – viola principal
 Bruce White – viola
 Rachel Bolt – viola
 George Robertson – viola
 Garfield Jackson – viola
 Ivo Van der Werff – viola
 Tony Pleeth – cello principal
 Dave Daniels – cello
 Caroline Dale – cello
 Ben Chappell – cello
 Chris Laurence – double bass principal
 Paddy Lannigan – double bass

Charts

References

External links

Everything's the Rush at YouTube (streamed copy where licensed)

2008 albums
Delays albums
Albums produced by Youth (musician)